Manfred Schukowski (born 16 January 1928) is a German academic teacher and author of works on astronomical clocks.

Life 
Schukowski grew up in Stralsund where he was born and attended school there from 1934 to 1944. After the Second World War, he worked as a Neulehrer, from 1946 at the central school in Koblentz and from 1947 to 1949 at the school in Negast. In 1948, he passed the first teacher's examination, and from 1949 to 1950 he took the subject course in mathematics/physics at the Diesterweg Institute for Teacher Training in Putbus. He passed the Second Teacher's Examination in 1950 and was a teacher of mathematics and physics at the Torgelow secondary school from 1950 to 1953. From 1953 to 1954, he attended the special physics course at the Pädagogische Hochschule "Karl Liebknecht" in Potsdam.

From 1954 to 1959 and from 1962 to 1965, Schukowski was a research assistant/lecturer at the physics methodology department of the Pädagogische Hochschule Halle-Köthen. In between, from 1959 to 1962, he was a teacher at the Gymnasium für deutsche Sprache in Lovech (Bulgaria). In 1963, he acquired an external teaching qualification for astronomy at the baccalaureate level at the Potsdam College of Education. From 1965 to 1969, he was head of physics/astronomy at the school administration of the Rostock district of the GDR. He was responsible for teacher training from 1969 to 1990.

In 1970, he received his doctorate at the University of Rostock, where he habilitated in 1979; since 1977, he has held the title of professor.

Since 1978 he has been working on astronomical clocks. He calculated the new calendar disc of the astronomical clock of the St. Mary's Church, Rostock, which was put into use on 1 January 2018 and goes until 2150.

Work 
Schukowski published various works on the methodology of teaching physics and astronomy, as well as textbooks and numerous works on astronomical clocks in the Baltic region, including several books.

 Die astronomische Uhr in St. Marien zu Rostock. Langewiesche, Königstein im Taunus 2010,  (with English summary)
 Wunderuhren in Kirchen: Astronomische Uhren in Kirchen der Hansezeit. Helms, Schwerin 2006, 
 Astronomie, neue Rechtschreibung, Lehrbuch. Cornelsen 1999, 
 Wissensspeicher: Astronomie: Nachschlagewerk. Cornelsen 1995,
 Sonne, Mond und zwölf Apostel. Die Astronomische Uhr in der Marienkirche zu Rostock. Helms, Schwerin 2012,

Honours 
 1995 Kulturpreis der Hansestadt Rostock.
 2013 Philipp Matthäus Hahn-Medaille of the Deutsche Gesellschaft für Chronometrie

References

Further reading 
 M. und W. Fritz: Nordlichter – Portraits aus der Hansestadt Rostock und der Region. 1998, .
 Helmut Graumann: Persönlichkeiten aus Mecklenburg und Vorpommern. 2001, .

External links 
 
 
 
 

20th-century German educators
1928 births
Living people
People from Stralsund